Hydrelia is a genus of moths in the family Geometridae erected by Jacob Hübner in 1825.

Species
Hydrelia aggerata Prout, 1938
Hydrelia albifera (Walker, 1866) - fragile white carpet moth
Hydrelia arizana (Wileman, 1911)
Hydrelia aurantiaca Hampson, 1903
Hydrelia bella (Wileman, 1916)
Hydrelia bicauliata Prout, 1914
Hydrelia bicolorata (Moore, 1868)
Hydrelia binotata Inoue, 1987
Hydrelia brunneifasciata (Packard, 1876)
Hydrelia castaria (Leech, 1897)
Hydrelia chionata (Lederer, 1870)
Hydrelia cingulata Hampson, 1896
Hydrelia condensata (Walker, 1862)
Hydrelia conspicuaria (Leech, 1897)
Hydrelia controversa Inoue, 1982
Hydrelia crocearia Hampson, 1896
Hydrelia elegans (Inoue, 1982)
Hydrelia enisaria Prout, 1926
Hydrelia flammeolaria (Hufnagel, 1767) - small yellow wave
Hydrelia flammulata (Bastelberger, 1911)
Hydrelia flavidula (Warren, 1907)
Hydrelia flavilinea (Warren, 1893)
Hydrelia fuscocastanea Inoue, 1982
Hydrelia gracilipennis Inoue, 1982
Hydrelia impleta Prout, 1938
Hydrelia inornata (Hulst, 1896)
Hydrelia laetivirga Prout, 1934
Hydrelia latsaria (Oberthur, 1893)
Hydrelia leucogramma Wehrli, 1931
Hydrelia lineata (Warren, 1893)
Hydrelia lucata (Guenee, 1857)
Hydrelia luteosparsata Sterneck, 1928
Hydrelia marginepunctata Warren, 1893
Hydrelia microptera Inoue, 1987
Hydrelia musculata (Staudinger, 1897)
Hydrelia nepalensis Inoue, 1987
Hydrelia nisaria (Christoph, 1881)
Hydrelia ochrearia Leech, 1897
Hydrelia ornata (Moore, 1868)
Hydrelia parvularia (Leech, 1897)
Hydrelia parvulata (Staudinger, 1897)
Hydrelia pavonica Xue, 1999
Hydrelia percandidata (Christoph, 1893)
Hydrelia rhodoptera Hampson, 1895
Hydrelia rubraria Hampson, 1903
Hydrelia rubricosta Inoue, 1982
Hydrelia rubrilinea Inoue, 1987
Hydrelia rubrivena Wileman, 1911
Hydrelia rufigrisea (Warren, 1893)
Hydrelia rufinota Hampson, 1896
Hydrelia sanguiflua Hampson, 1896
Hydrelia sanguiniplaga Swinhoe, 1902
Hydrelia scotozona Yazaki, 1995
Hydrelia sericea (Butler, 1880)
Hydrelia shioyana (Matsumura, 1927)
Hydrelia speciosa Inoue, 1992
Hydrelia subcingulata Inoue, 1987
Hydrelia sublatsaria Wehrli, 1938
Hydrelia subobliquaria (Moore, 1868)
Hydrelia subtestacea Inoue, 1982
Hydrelia sylvata (Denis & Schiffermuller, 1775) - waved carpet
Hydrelia tenera (Staudinger, 1897)
Hydrelia terraenovae Krogerus, 1954
Hydrelia ulula Bastelberger, 1911
Hydrelia undularia (Leech, 1897)
Hydrelia undulosata (Moore, 1888)

Former species
Asthenotricha argyridia (H. argyridia (Butler, 1894))
Asthenotricha candace (H. candace Prout, 1929)
Asthenotricha costalis (H. costalis Aurivillius, 1910)
Asthenotricha meruana (H. meruana Aurivillius, 1910)
Asthenotricha sjostedti (H. sjostedti Aurivillius, 1910)

References

External links

Asthenini
Geometridae genera